Wei Zheng is an American pharmaceutical scientist and toxicologist. He is currently the Head of the School of Health Sciences at Purdue University.

Biography

Zheng received his BS in pharmacy from the Zhejiang University College of Pharmacy in Hangzhou, China; He received a MS in pharmacology from the same college. Zheng later went to study in the United States, and obtained Ph.D. in pharmacology and toxicology from the University of Arizona in Tucson, Arizona.

From 1993 to 2003, Zheng worked as an assistant professor (1993-2000) and later associate professor (2000-2003) in the School of Public Health and College of Physicians and Surgeons at Columbia University in New York. Zheng joined the faculty of Purdue University in West Lafayette, Indiana in 2003.

Zheng is currently serving as a professor of Health Sciences and Toxicology, the Associate Dean of the College of Pharmacy, Nursing and Health Sciences, and the Head of the School of Health Sciences at Purdue University.

Zheng was a member of the NIH Environmental Health Sciences Review Committee (2003-2007) and a member of the NIH/NAL Study Section (2008-2012). Zheng was also elected into the Society of Toxicology, the Society for Neuroscience, and the New York Academy of Sciences. Within the toxicology community, he served as the President of the Metals Specialty Section of SOT (2009-2010) and Chair of SOT Board of Publication (2016-2019). Zheng is also the Board Member of Chinese Society of Toxicology. Zheng is listed in Marquis Who's Who in America published in 2009. Zheng was the president of International Society for Trace Element Research in Humans from 2015-2019. Zheng is the Fellow of Academy of Toxicological Sciences.

Published works
 The Blood-Cerebrospinal Fluid Barrier. CRC Press, New York. 2005 (with Chodobski, A)

References

 Publications can be found in Google Scholar

External links
 Personal research website can be found in this link 

Living people
American pharmacists
American pharmacologists
Zhejiang University alumni
University of Arizona alumni
Columbia University faculty
Columbia Medical School faculty
Chinese emigrants to the United States
Purdue University faculty
Year of birth missing (living people)